Tottemo! Luckyman is a Japanese manga series written and illustrated by Hiroshi Gamo. A pilot chapter was published in the 1993 17th issue of Shueisha's Weekly Shōnen Jump published on April 12, 1993. The regular serialization started in the 35th issue of the magazine on August 16, 1993, and it finished in the 30th issue of July 7, 1997.

Volumes list
<onlyinclude>

References

Tottemo! Luckyma